"Cue Detective" is the second episode of the twenty-seventh season of the American animated television series The Simpsons, and the 576th episode of the series overall. It aired in the United States on Fox on October 4, 2015.

Plot
After watching the movie Doctor Dolittle at school, the children realize that Bart and Lisa smell badly and they start teasing them about it. The same thing happens to Homer at the nuclear plant with his co-workers mocking his scent. Marge then discovers that the smell is coming from their clothes because their washing machine is old and covered in mold. She then gives Homer a bag of her savings (stored in Bender's body, which has been in their basement since the events of "Simpsorama") so they can buy a new washing machine. On his way to the store, Homer smells something delicious and discovers a roadside barbecue stand run by an old biker. When Homer eats the best BBQ he has ever had, the biker reveals that the secret is that the smoker was made from a meteorite with a unique beehive shape that has trapped all of the fat and sauce from every grilling ever. Homer gladly passes up the washing machine to buy the smoker for himself.

Marge gets upset that Homer spent all her money on a "grill" but is won over by the taste of the uniquely-grilled food that she joins the family feast, with Lisa eating a barbecued carrot. The aroma draws people from all over Springfield to the Simpsons' backyard to feast on savory cuts of meat. Eventually, Homer's grill becomes so popular that "Chew Network" chef, Scotty Boom, challenges him to a smoke-off. Whilst preparing smoked pork for the competition, Homer discovers that his smoker has been stolen.

After a distraught Homer calls the police who are unable to find the smoker, Bart and Lisa decide to investigate the crime themselves. They investigate the yard and discover that the thief gave Santa's Little Helper a jar of natural peanut butter to distract him from barking. The duo then proceed to the one store in town that sells natural peanut butter, where they coerce a worker into letting them see the security camera footage, which shows Nelson purchasing the peanut butter. Bart and Lisa go talk to Nelson in a park, where he is playing a tablet game called "Clash of Castles" with some expensive upgrades. Nelson is reticent and runs towards a scrap yard to meet someone shortly afterwards, where the duo observe him being paid and revealing the smoker under some trees. Nelson leaves the smoker behind, but it is too hot for Bart and Lisa to walk it back and it ends up being loaded onto the truck and driven away.

Homer, Bart, Lisa and Maggie give up hope on the competition, but Marge convinces them that she can handle the smoke-off with the help of a rented spice rack. At the competition, hosted by Alton Brown, Marge does her best against Scotty but fails miserably because she used all of the spices together. However, when Scotty presents his meat, it is discovered that the hive shaped grill marks on it do not match his normal grill and he is accused of cheating. Scotty is fired from the "Chew Network", banned from the competition, and arrested by Chief Wiggum. Though the Simpsons are then proclaimed winners, Bart and Lisa are still confused until they hear the same cellphone ringtone they heard when Nelson was delivering the smoker and so they decide to chase the phone's owner down. When they catch him up, they discover that he is actually Scotty's son, Tyler, who framed his father because he was too busy with his TV show and did not spend any time with his family. Tyler explains that he met Nelson playing "Clash of Castles" and hired him to steal Homer's smoker in order to frame him. Scotty and Tyler soon reconcile, everything is cleared up with the authorities and Tyler gives Homer's smoker back.

During the end credits, several scenes show the future of the Hive Smoker, starting with the Simpsons trading it to Nelson for a new washing machine, and ending with alien bee people taking the hive back into space; while the song "Far from any road" is playing (opening song of the tv series True Detective).

Reception
The episode received a 2.7 rating and was watched by a total of 6.02 million people, making it the most watched show on Fox that night.

Dennis Perkins of The A.V. Club gave the episode a B−, who said that the episode is "the sort of well-told, modest Simpsons story that the show can still pull off. It’s not flashy, the sort of everyday Simpsons story that tends to get lost in the din of both subpar late-career Simpsons episodes and people complaining about subpar late-career Simpsons episodes. But if there were more episodes like it, the clamor would die down a bit."

References

External links 
 

2015 American television episodes
The Simpsons (season 27) episodes